Kreshnic Krasniqi (born 15 September 1994) is a Kosovan footballer who plays as a midfielder for  Dulwich Hamlet.

Club career
On 20 September 2014, Kreshnic made his professional debut for Ethnikos Achna in the Cypriot First Division during the 2–1 loss to Nea Salamis, coming on as a 68th-minute substitute. He later played for Heybridge Swifts as a midfielder.

Krasniqi joined Ebbsfleet United in June 2021.

On 5 February 2022, Krasniqi returned to former club Billericay Town on an initial one-month loan deal.

On 29 June 2022, Krasniqi joined fellow National League South club Dulwich Hamlet.

Career statistics

Club

References

1994 births
Living people
English footballers
Kosovan footballers
Association football midfielders
Ormideia F.C. players
Ethnikos Achna FC players
ENTHOI Lakatamia FC players
Billericay Town F.C. players
Enfield Town F.C. players
Barking F.C. players
Heybridge Swifts F.C. players
Concord Rangers F.C. players
Wealdstone F.C. players
Maidstone United F.C. players
Ebbsfleet United F.C. players
Dulwich Hamlet F.C. players
Cypriot First Division players
Isthmian League players
National League (English football) players
Kosovan expatriate footballers
Kosovan expatriate sportspeople in Cyprus
Expatriate footballers in England
Expatriate footballers in Cyprus
Kosovan expatriate sportspeople in England